The first season of Dansez pentru tine the Romanian version of Dancing with the Stars debuted on PRO TV in 2006. Eight celebrities were paired with eight professional ballroom dancers. Ștefan Bănică, Jr. and Olivia Steer were the hosts for this season. Winners this season were Andra & Florin Birică.

Couples
The 8 celebrities and professional dance partners were:

Season 01
2006 Romanian television seasons